Totten may refer to:

Places
 Totten (mountain), a mountain in Hemsedal, Norway
 Fort Totten (disambiguation)
 Totten Glacier, Antarctica
 Totten Inlet, Puget Sound, Washington, United States
 Totten Key, island in the Florida Keys, United States
 Totten Prairie, Illinois, United States

People
 Alex Totten, Scottish football player and manager
 Archibald W. O. Totten (1809–1867), Justice of the Tennessee Supreme Court
 Charles Adelle Lewis Totten, (1851–1908), American military officer, and influential early advocate of British Israelism
 Donald L. Totten (1933–2019), an American politician and mechanical engineer
 George Muirson Totten, (1809–1884), American civil engineer
 George Oakley Totten Jr. (1866–1939), an American architect
 Henry Totten (1824–1899), an American politician and businessman
 Henry Roland Totten, (1892–1975), an American botanist
 James Totten, (1818–1871), an officer in the Union Army and Missouri militia general during the American Civil War and was the Assistant Inspector General.
 Joseph Gilbert Totten, (1788–1864), cofounder of the National Academy of Sciences
 Michael Totten (born 1970), American writer
 Robert J. Totten, director of Gunsmoke
 Samuel Totten, Genocide Scholar and Activist, Professor Emeritus, University of Arkansas
 Scott Totten, American musician
 Willie Totten (b. 1962), head coach of the Mississippi Valley State University football team

Other
 Totten trust

See also
Tottenham (disambiguation)
Tottenville, Staten Island